Godfrey Hall may refer to:

 pseudonym of Godfrey Ho (born 1948), former Hong Kong-based film director and screenwriter
 Godfrey Hall (racing driver) (born 1949), British auto racing driver